Kimberley A. Laing Williams (born 8 January 1988 in St. Catherine) is a Jamaican athlete specialising in the 100 metres hurdles. She represented her country at the 2015 World Championships reaching the semifinals. In addition, she finished fourth at the 2015 Pan American Games.

Her personal bests are 12.89 seconds in the 100 metres hurdles (-1.1 m/s, Kingston 2015) and 8.23 seconds in the 60 metres hurdles (Fayetteville 2010).

Competition record

References

1989 births
Living people
Jamaican female hurdlers
Athletes (track and field) at the 2015 Pan American Games
People from Saint Catherine Parish
World Athletics Championships athletes for Jamaica
Pan American Games competitors for Jamaica